Marquess Townshend  is a title in the Peerage of Great Britain held by the Townshend family of Raynham Hall in Norfolk. The title was created in 1787 for George Townshend, 4th Viscount Townshend.

History
The Townshend family descends from Roger Townshend, who in 1617 was created a baronet, of Raynham in the County of Norfolk, in the Baronetage of England. He later represented Orford and Norfolk in the House of Commons. His younger son, the third Baronet (who succeeded his elder brother), played an important role in the restoration of the monarchy after the Civil War and was also Member of Parliament for Norfolk. In 1661 he was created Baron Townshend, of Lynn Regis in the County of Norfolk, and in 1682 he was further honoured when he was made Viscount Townshend, of Raynham in the County of Norfolk. Both titles were in the Peerage of England.

He was succeeded by his son, the second Viscount. He was a prominent statesman and served as Secretary of State for the Northern Department from 1714 to 1716 and from 1721 to 1730. Lord Townshend is also remembered for the agricultural reforms he undertook at his Norfolk estate and gained the nickname "Turnip Townshend". His eldest son, the third Viscount, briefly represented Great Yarmouth in the House of Commons. However, in 1723, during his father's lifetime, he was summoned to the House of Lords through a writ of acceleration in his father's junior title of Baron Townshend (although he was styled "Lord Lynn", taken from the territorial designation of the barony, to distinguish him from his father). Lord Townshend later served as Lord Lieutenant of Norfolk.

He was succeeded by his eldest son, the fourth Viscount. He was a Field Marshal in the Army and served as Lord Lieutenant of Ireland and as Master-General of the Ordnance. In 1787 he was created Marquess Townshend in the Peerage of Great Britain. Lord Townshend married as his first wife Charlotte Compton, 16th Baroness Ferrers of Chartley and 7th Baroness Compton. He was succeeded by his eldest son, the second Marquess. He had already on his mother's death in 1770 succeeded in the baronies Ferrers of Chartley and Compton. In 1784, 23 years before he succeeded his father, he was created Earl of Leicester in the Peerage of Great Britain. His choice of title derived from his descent from Lady Lucy Sydney, daughter of Robert Sidney, 2nd Earl of Leicester (a title which had become extinct in 1743). Lord Townshend later held office as Master of the Mint, as Joint Postmaster General and as Lord Steward of the Household.

His son, the third Marquess, was childless. On his death in 1855 the earldom of Leicester became extinct while the baronies of Ferrers of Chartley and Compton fell into abeyance. He was succeeded in the other titles by his first cousin, the fourth Marquess. He was the son of Lord John Townshend, second son of the first Marquess. Lord Townshend was a Rear-Admiral in the Royal Navy and also sat as Member of Parliament for Tamworth. His son, the fifth Marquess, also represented Tamworth in Parliament (as a Liberal).  the titles are held by the latter's great-grandson, the eighth Marquess, who succeeded his father in April 2010.

Several other members of the Townshend family have also gained distinction. Charles Townshend, second son of the third Viscount, was a prominent statesman and orator and served as Chancellor of the Exchequer from 1766 to 1767. The politician Thomas Townshend, 1st Viscount Sydney, after whom the town of Sydney, Australia, was named, was the son of the Hon. Thomas Townshend, second son of the second Viscount. Sydney's grandson was the Liberal politician John Townshend, 1st Earl Sydney. Charles Townshend, 1st Baron Bayning, was the son of the Hon. William Townshend, third son of the second Viscount. See also Roger Townshend, Admiral George Townshend, Lord Charles Townshend, Lord John Townshend, Lord Charles Townshend, Lord James Townshend, Charles Fox Townshend and Major-General Sir Charles Vere Ferrers Townshend.

As Lord Townshend holds no titles with names different from his main title, the territorial designation from his viscountcy is used for his heir, who is styled Viscount Raynham. Between 1807 and 1855 the courtesy title was Earl of Leicester (although the title was not used from 1811 to 1855 as there was no a real heir apparent to the marquessate during this period, but earldom "usurped" by John Dunn-Gardner in 1823–1843), while from 1782 to 1855 the courtesy title used by the heir apparent to the earldom of Leicester was Lord Ferrers of Chartley (and consequently was not used from 1811 to 1855 as there was no a real heir apparent either to the earldom or marquessate).

The current Marquess holds the subsidiary titles: Viscount Townshend, of Raynham in the County of Norfolk (created 1682); Baron Townshend, of Lynn Regis in the County of Norfolk (created 1661); Townshend Baronet, 'of Raynham in the County of Norfolk' (created 1617), all of which in the Peerage of England. As noted above, due to being of the same name as the primary title, the Viscountcy has been called "Viscount Raynham" and the Barony "Baron Lynn".

The family seat is Raynham Hall, Fakenham, Norfolk.

Townshend baronets, of Raynham (1617)

Sir Roger Townshend, 1st Baronet (1596–1637)
Sir Roger Townshend, 2nd Baronet (1628–1648)
Sir Horatio Townshend, 3rd Baronet (1630–1687) (created Baron Townshend in 1661 and Viscount Townshend in 1682)

Viscounts Townshend (1682)

Horatio Townshend, 1st Viscount Townshend (1630–1687)
Charles Townshend, 2nd Viscount Townshend (1674–1738)
Charles Townshend, 3rd Viscount Townshend (1700–1764)
George Townshend, 4th Viscount Townshend (1724–1807) (created Marquess Townshend in 1787)

Marquesses Townshend (1787)
George Townshend, 1st Marquess Townshend (1724–1807)
George Townshend, 2nd Marquess Townshend, 1st Earl of Leicester (1753–1811)
George Ferrars Townshend, 3rd Marquess Townshend, 2nd Earl of Leicester (1778–1855)
John Townshend, 4th Marquess Townshend (1798–1863)
John Villiers Stuart Townshend, 5th Marquess Townshend (1831–1899)
John James Dudley Stuart Townshend, 6th Marquess Townshend (1866–1921)
George John Patrick Dominic Townshend, 7th Marquess Townshend (1916–2010)
Charles George Townshend, 8th Marquess Townshend (b. 1945)

Present peer
Charles George Townshend, 8th Marquess Townshend (born 26 September 1945) is the son of the 7th Marquess and his wife Elizabeth Pamela Audrey Luby. He was styled as Viscount Raynham from birth and was educated at Eton College.

On 23 April 2010 he succeeded as Marquess Townshend (G.B., 1787), Viscount Townshend of Raynham (E., 1682), and Baron Townshend of Lynn Regis (E., 1682), and also became  the 13th Townshend baronet, of Rainham, Norfolk (1617).

On 9 October 1975, he married firstly Hermione Ponsonby, daughter of Lt.-Commander Robert Martin Dominic Ponsonby RN and Dorothy Edith Jane Lane. In 1990 he married, secondly Alison Combs, daughter of Sir Willis Ide Combs. With his first wife he has two children:
Thomas Charles Townshend, Viscount Raynham (born 1977)
Lady Louise Elizabeth Townshend (born 1979)

The heir apparent is the present holder's son, whose heir presumptive is his son Rafe Thomas Townshend (born 2014).

 George Townshend, 1st Marquess Townshend (1724–1807)
Lord John Townshend (1757–1833)
 John Townshend, 4th Marquess Townshend (1798–1863)
 John Townshend, 5th Marquess Townshend (1831–1899)
 John Townshend, 6th Marquess Townshend (1866–1921)
 George Townshend, 7th Marquess Townshend (1916–2010)
 Charles Townshend, 8th Marquess Townshend (b. 1945)
(1). Thomas Townshend, Viscount Raynham (b. 1977)
(2). Hon. Rafe Thomas Townshend (b. 2014)
(3). Lord John Patrick Townshend (b. 1962)
(4). George Townshend (b. 2003)
Rev. Lord George Osborne Townshend (1801–1876)
George Ferrars Townshend (1854–1942)
Ferrars Ernest Osborne Townshend (1882–1953)
Henry George Townshend  (1911–1979)
Ferrars Edwin Townshend (1944–2017)
male issue in succession
Ernest Edwin Townshend (1858–1945)
Clifford Edwin Townshend (1884–1958)
John Edwin Townshend (1918–1990)
male issue in succession
George Maling Townshend (b. 1921)
male issue in succession
Charles Roberts Townshend (1926–1987)
male issue in succession

See also
Earl Sydney
Baron Bayning
Baron Compton
Earl of Leicester (1618 creation)

Notes

References 
Kidd, Charles, Williamson, David (editors). Debrett's Peerage and Baronetage (1990 edition). New York: St Martin's Press, 1990,

External links
Townshend family website
http://home.worldonline.co.za/~townshend/lordsarms.htm#top

 

Marquessates in the Peerage of Great Britain
Marquess Townshend
1617 establishments in England
Noble titles created in 1787
People from Raynham, Norfolk